The mayor of Baltimore is the head of the executive branch of the government of the City of Baltimore, Maryland. The Mayor has the duty to enforce city laws, and the power to either approve or veto bills, ordinances, or resolutions passed by the unicameral Baltimore City Council. In addition, the Mayor oversees all city services, public property, police and fire protection, most public agencies, and  shares with the Governor of Maryland, responsibilities for the public school system within the city limits. As of May 2, 2019, the Office of the mayor of the City of Baltimore has changed hands 62 times with 53 different individuals in assuming office in the 220 years of city government, 1797–2017. The Office of the Mayor is located in the historic Baltimore City Hall located at 100 Holliday Street in downtown Baltimore.

History
James Calhoun was first elected in 1794 under the old Baltimore Town government with a group of town commissioners, and continued as the new first mayor under the new City Charter in 1796–97, when the city was incorporated as the "City of Baltimore" (occasionally entitled officially as the "Mayor and City Council of Baltimore")  under the authority of the General Assembly of Maryland which had originally authorized the port in 1706 and the creation in 1729 and laying out of a town in early 1730.  Calhoun continued to serve for another seven years until 1804.

Serving as the "county seat" since finagling a scheme to move the courthouse, replacing old Joppa in 1767 of surrounding Baltimore County which had been "erected" (authorized) in 1659 as the fifth county designated in the Province and first county in northern Maryland. The city was separated from the adjacent County by the provisions of the adoption of the new second Maryland Constitution of 1851 and became an independent city with the same status as the other 22 (later 23) counties of Maryland. Then the county seat for Baltimore County was moved after an election/referendum to Towsontown (later Towson, Maryland), a few miles north of Baltimore with the building there of its first Courthouse structure three years later with surrounding square of landscaped grassy lawns between Allegheny, Pennsylvania and Chesapeake Streets in 1854.

Six individuals are credited with multiple, non-consecutive returns to the office after completing an initial term, and are counted as separate mayoralties.  These are:
Edward Johnson (twice), John Montgomery, Ferdinand C. Latrobe (elected four times), Howard W. Jackson, William F. Broening, and Theodore R. McKeldin.

The mayor was originally elected to a term of two years under the original City Charter of 1796–1797. In 1920, the charter was amended so the mayor serves a term of four years. There are no limits on the number of terms a mayor may serve.

For years, the mayor was elected in the year immediately preceding the presidential election. However, in 2012, the 2015 election was postponed to 2016 in order to better align with national elections. As a result, incumbent Stephanie Rawlings-Blake had her term extended an additional year. An earlier attempt to move the mayoral election to the same year as presidential elections was made in 1999, but went awry when the General Assembly refused to move the primary election. As a result, then-incumbent Martin O'Malley was nominated for a second term in 2003, then had to wait over a year to run in and win the general election.

Baltimore has experienced major turnover in the mayor's office in recent years, in large part due to corruption scandals. In September 2015, incumbent mayor Stephanie Rawlings-Blake announced she would not seek re-election, setting up a hotly-contested primary election in the heavily Democratic city in 2016. Maryland State Senator Catherine Pugh defeated former mayor Shelia Dixon, who resigned from office in 2010 after pleading guilty to misappropriating holiday gift cards intended to serve poor Baltimore residents. Pugh easily defeated Republican Alan Walden and Green Party candidate Joshua Harris to become the 50th Mayor of Baltimore, and was sworn in on December 6, 2016. Pugh resigned on May 2, 2019, amid a scandal in which Pugh was accused of, and eventually pled guilty to charges of fraud, conspiracy, and tax evasion regarding a scheme to sell copies of a self-published children's book series, known as Healthy Holly, to the University of Maryland Medical System without competition. Upon Pugh's resignation, then-City Council President Jack Young took over as Mayor. In the 2020 Democratic primary, Young went up against Dixon, his successor as City Council President Brandon Scott, former T. Rowe Price executive and Obama Administration Treasury Department official Mary Miller, former federal prosecutor and deputy Attorney General of Maryland Thiruvendran Vignarajah. Scott narrowly edged out Dixon, with Young finishing a distant fifth. Brandon Scott was elected with more than 70% of the vote in the November general election, and was sworn in as the city's 52nd Mayor on December 8, 2020.

Some well-known political and historical figures to have held the office of Mayor of Baltimore include:

 Samuel Smith, Revolutionary War soldier and War of 1812 commander, twice elected to the House of Representatives and Senate respectively, twice served as President Pro Tempore of the Senate, served as Mayor from 1835 until 1838.
 Thomas Swann, member of the American Party, better known as the "Know-Nothings," served as Mayor from 1856 until 1860, was elected as the 33rd Governor of Maryland in 1866, and subsequently served in the House of Representatives for ten years until 1879.
 William Pinkney Whyte, served as mayor from 1881 until 1883, served three non-consecutive terms as United States Senator, was elected the 35th Governor of Maryland in 1872, and as Attorney General of Maryland in 1887.
 Thomas D'Alesandro, Jr., served three terms as Mayor from 1947 until 1959, best known outside of Baltimore as the father to future Speaker of the House of Representatives Nancy Pelosi, son Thomas D'Alesandro III also served as Mayor for one term from 1967 until 1971.
 William Donald Schaefer, served four terms as Mayor, the most of anyone to hold the office, from 1971 until 1987, when he became the 58th Governor of Maryland. Schaefer would also serve as Comptroller of Maryland later in life from 1999 until 2007.
 Kurt Schmoke, served three terms as Mayor from 1987 until 1999, was the first African-American to be elected Mayor of Baltimore.
 Martin O'Malley, served two terms as Mayor of Baltimore from 1999 until 2007, when he became the 61st Governor of Maryland, was a candidate for the Democratic nomination for President of the United States in 2016, dropped out of contest in the winter of 2016 after failing to secure a strong finish in the Iowa caucuses.

List

See also

References

External links
List of Mayors of Baltimore from the Maryland Archives

Baltimore
 
Mayors